Maneb is a fungicide and a polymeric complex of manganese with the ethylene bis(dithiocarbamate) anionic ligand.

Applications
It can be also used to create a toxin-based animal model of Parkinson's disease, usually in primates.

Regulation
It was included in a pesticide ban proposed by the Swedish Chemicals Agency  and approved by the European Parliament on January 13, 2009.

See also
Metam sodium - A related dithiocarbamate salt which is also used as a fungicide.
Zineb - ethylene bis(dithiocarbamate) with zinc instead of manganese.
Mancozeb - A common fungicide containing Zineb and Maneb.

References

External links
 

Fungicides
Manganese(II) compounds
Polymers
Dithiocarbamates